The Return of Wild Bill is a 1940 American Western film directed by Joseph H. Lewis and written by Robert Lee Johnson and Fred Myton. The film stars Wild Bill Elliott, Iris Meredith, George Lloyd, Luana Walters, Edward LeSaint and Frank LaRue. The film was released on June 27, 1940, by Columbia Pictures.

Plot

Cast          
Wild Bill Elliott as Wild Bill Saunders
Iris Meredith as Sammy Lou Griffin
George Lloyd as Matt Kilgore
Luana Walters as Kate Kilgore
Edward LeSaint as Lige Saunders
Frank LaRue as Ole Mitch
Francis Walker as Jake Kilgore
Chuck Morrison as Bart
Dub Taylor as Cannonball
Buel Bryant as Mike
William Kellogg as Hep
John Ince as Sam Griffin
Jack Rockwell as Sheriff
John Merton as Dusty Donahue
Donald Haines as Bobby

References

External links
 

1940 films
1940s English-language films
American Western (genre) films
1940 Western (genre) films
Columbia Pictures films
Films directed by Joseph H. Lewis
American black-and-white films
1940s American films